John Denison may refer to:

 John Denison (MP) (c. 1758–1820), British Member of Parliament for Wootton Bassett 1796–1802, for Colchester 1802–1806, and for Minehead 1807–1812
 John Denison (arts administrator) (1911–2006), British music administrator
 John Denison (engineer) (1916–2001), ice road engineer who operated in the Northwest Territories, Canada
 John G. Denison, acting CEO and chairman of ATA Airlines and Global Aero Logistics, Inc
 John A. Denison (1875–1948), American Politician of the Commonwealth of Massachusetts
 John Evelyn Denison, 1st Viscount Ossington (1800–1873), British statesman
 John Denison (Royal Navy officer) (1853–1939), Canadian member of the Royal Navy

See also
 John Dennison (born 1978), New Zealand poet
 John Dennison, the first elected representative of New Zealand's Opportunities Party
 John Denniston (disambiguation)